The Rivoli Ballroom is the only intact 1950s ballroom remaining in London, England. It is famed for its original decor and interior fittings, including red velvet, flock wallpaper, chandeliers, glitter balls and oversized Chinese lanterns. The venue is often used as a film location and plays host to many dance and musical events.

History
The current building was originally the Crofton Park Picture Palace which opened in July 1913. It was designed by Henley Attwater with a simple barrel-vaulted auditorium. It became The Rivoli Cinema in 1929.

The last film there was shown on 2 March 1957 after which the building was converted to a dance hall by local businessman Leonard Tomlin. It reopened as The Rivoli on Boxing Day, 1959 with a large Canadian sprung maple dance floor. Further improvements were made with the addition of a Member's Bar in 1960. It is currently owned by Bill Mannix.

Style

Exterior
The Brockley Road frontage is based on an Art Deco elevation which dates from 1931. A broad flight of steps passes into a deep-recessed central foyer. Pilasters, topped with plasterwork urns, terminate the elevation and the frontage currently features two signs reading 'Dancing' and 'Tonight'.

Interior

The ballroom comprises an eclectic mix of neo-classical, Deco and oriental motifs set within an exotic and luxuriant decorative scheme mainly dating from the 1950s. The main auditorium ceiling survives from the earlier cinema. From the off-street entrance steps a small foyer is reached featuring a raked floor and Deco-style marquetry panelling. The main motif is a geometric composition of intersecting curves in a shape with broad segmental top, tapering centre and curved base. The design is accentuated through the use of dark wood inlay and a diamond shape in the centre is picked out in glass or mirror. Although 1920s in inspiration, it is characteristic of the 1950s fashion for reviving the Deco aesthetic that had been unwillingly abandoned with the onset of WWII.

The foyer leads directly into the ballroom, a large auditorium with a shallow barrel-vaulted ceiling, complete with raised viewing dais, stage, proscenium, fixed banquettes and a sprung maple dance floor. The decorative scheme is kitsch and flamboyant, the effect created through red velour padded walls with gilt picture-frame style panels and decorated pilasters, scallop-shaped lights, a red velour pelmet, French chandeliers and Chinese lanterns.

Either side of the ballroom are two bars, running the length of the hall, one dating 1958 and the other of 1960. The right hand bar of 1958 features booths and tables with leather upholstery arranged similar to a railway-carriage. The bar at the end of the room has a tiled front of Arabesque interlaced patterns. Lighting is provided by exotic saucer-shaped lamps decorated with a mixture of Georgian and oriental patterns. The panelling motif established in the foyer is continued on various doors, to the ladies powder room and the gentleman's cloakroom for example, and there is also signage throughout the building some of which, to the 'Buffet' for example, appears to be contemporary with the late 1950s refurbishment.

There is a second function room, dating from the late twentieth century, with a neo-classical decorative scheme with gilded Corinthian capitals, a modillion cornice and Adam-esque garlands along the beams which support a ceiling adorned with photographs of Old Master paintings; this room is not of special interest.

Venue usage
It has found favour with pop video producers and style shoots – Tina Turner's "Private Dancer" video was shot there and rock band Oasis, pop group S Club 7, singers Charlotte Church and Martine McCutcheon, fashion model Kate Moss are some glitterati to make use of the venue for shoots. It is probably most famously remembered for its use in the 1983 Elton John video for the song "I Guess That's Why They Call It The Blues".

Live music plays a part at the Rivoli regularly. Indie rock band The White Stripes played a gig there on 12 June 2007. Florence + the Machine played a live show there on 7 July 2009, which appears on the DVD packaged with the special edition box set of Lungs, and returned there on 8 November 2012 for a Radio 2 Live In Concert broadcast. On 30 April 2014, Damon Albarn performed with his touring band The Heavy Seas, with a guest appearance by Kano. It is, however, more usual to find jive, rock and roll and swing bands making use of the ballroom.

Television host Justin Lee Collins also filmed his chat-show series Good Times there in March 2010. On 27 October 2010, Kings Of Leon performed a set for BBC Radio 1. The music video released for Lana Del Rey's promotional single, "Burning Desire", was filmed at the Rivoli Ballroom by Ridley Scott in 2013.

The Rivoli Ballroom has been a location for some films. In 2014, the ballroom was used for a flashback sequence shot in the 1940s for the superhero film Avengers: Age of Ultron. Some scenes of the 2016 film The Infiltrator were shot here.

In March 2015, Noel Gallagher played a 'secret gig' for Absolute Radio, promoting his second solo album Chasing Yesterday.

In August 2017, Martine McCutcheon filmed her music video for 'Any Sign Of Life' from her latest album, 'Lost and Found'.

The Ballroom was used for a dance scene in the season 3 finale of the television drama series Killing Eve.

Parts of music video for "A Love like That", lead single of Katie Melua's "Album No. 8", were filmed in Rivoli Ballroom.

Listed building
On 21 December 2007, the building was granted Grade II-listed status by English Heritage in response to press concern about a possible sale, which might have led to its closure and demolition.

The venue was listed for the following reasons:

Special architectural interest: for the highly unusual interior of 1958, the total effect of which is luxuriant, exotic and deeply theatrical.
Special historic interest: as an eloquent and unusual witness to the era of American jive and swing bands, lindy hop, jitterbug and rock 'n' roll, alongside the continued popularity of traditional strict tempo ballroom.
A rare surviving example of a once common conversion of an early 20th-century cinema to a ballroom.

In conclusion it was noted: "The Rivoli Ballroom is a highly unusual building which is of special architectural interest for its flamboyant interior and special historic interest for its rarity as a surviving 1950s dance hall in a former cinema."

Transport connections
The ballroom is at 350 Brockley Road, which is opposite Crofton Park railway station and on several bus routes.

References

External links
Rivoli official website
Jive Party a monthly dance event held there
Jacky's Jukebox a monthly ballroom/Latin dance event held there
Entry on cinematreasures.org
Kings of Leon performance

Grade II listed buildings in the London Borough of Lewisham
Tourist attractions in the London Borough of Lewisham
Ballrooms in the United Kingdom